IBM is short form for International Business Machines, an American multinational technology and consulting corporation, with headquarters in Armonk, New York.

IBM may also refer to:
 IBM (atoms), a demonstration of the creation of the initials "IBM" using individual atoms in 1990
 Inclusion body myositis, an inflammatory muscle disease
 Injection blow molding, blow molding manufacturing process
 Interacting boson model, in nuclear physics
 International Brotherhood of Magicians
 itty bitty machine company, or "ibm", a small computer retail store in Evanston, Illinois, United States
 Izu–Bonin–Mariana Arc system, a plate tectonic convergent boundary in the Pacific Ocean
 Invisible Black Matter, a fictional substance in Ajin: Demi-Human

See also
 IBM railway station, near Greenock, Scotland, United Kingdom